Shinma Aungphyu , also known as Phyaleit Nat, is a prominent Burmese nat. She is commonly depicted wearing thanakha, donning a scarf and a htamein, and carrying a rolled up mat, which is why she is also known as Phyaleit Nat, which literally means "rolled mat."

References

Burmese nats
Burmese goddesses